Carmela Menashe (born 1949) is an Israeli journalist serving as a military reporter on IDF issues, on Israel's public radio Kol Yisrael.

Biography
Carmela Menashe is the daughter of Iraqi Jewish immigrants. She holds a master's degree in History of the Jewish People from Tel Aviv University. She served in the IDF Paratroopers Brigade. 
She has one daughter, Ella, whom she raised as a single mother. Besides her journalism career, she is known as a champion of IDF soldiers and their families, aiding those who have been harassed or neglected within the IDF.

Journalism career
In 1974, Menashe started working at Kol Yisrael as a secretary. After graduating from a correspondents course, she was appointed  the editor of the "Tzivei Keshset" radio program. Since 1994 she has also served as the director of military reporters at Kol Yisrael.
 
Menashe was the first female Israeli broadcaster to become a military correspondent.

Awards and recognition
Sokolov Award for her exposés and activities (1998)
 Bnot Brit award for outstanding contribution to society security
 Israel Broadcasting Authority's Ilan Roe Award presented by the CEO
 Movement for Quality Government in Israel award.
 Ometz - citizens for proper government and social and judicial justice award (2008)
 The EMET Prize for Art, Science and Culture, Category in the Social Sciences, field of Journalism (2010)
 In 2014, Menashe was chosen to light at torch at the Israel Independence Day ceremony on Mount Herzl.

See also
Women of Israel

References

1949 births
Iraqi emigrants to Israel
Israeli journalists
Israeli women journalists
Israeli reporters and correspondents
Israeli radio presenters
Israeli women radio presenters
Living people
EMET Prize recipients in the Social Sciences
Tel Aviv University alumni
Israeli people of Iraqi-Jewish descent